The African Handball Nations Championship is the official competition for senior national handball teams of Africa, and takes place every two years. In addition to crowning the African champions, the tournament also serves as a qualifying tournament for the Olympic Games and for World Handball Championship. Started in 1974, it is the oldest continental handball competition. The current champions are Egypt, who won the 2022 tournament in Egypt.

Only three countries have won the tournament. Tunisia, winner of the first edition, has won the title a record ten times. Egypt, with eight titles, and Algeria, with seven titles, are the only two other teams to have won the competition.

Both Morocco and Algeria were banned from hosting the African Handball Championship in 2022 and 2024, Egypt were chosen to host the tournaments instead.

Summaries

 Egypt finished 2nd however it was disqualified.
 A round-robin tournament determined the final standings.

Medal table

Participating nations
Legend

 – Champions
 – Runners-up
 – Third place
 – Fourth place

Q — Qualified for upcoming tournament
 — Qualified but withdrew
 — Did not qualify
 — Did not enter / Withdrew from the Championship
 — Disqualified / Banned
 — Hosts

See also
African Men's Junior Handball Championship
African Men's Youth Handball Championship
African Handball Champions League
African Handball Cup Winners' Cup
African Handball Super Cup

References

External links
Official website
Handball Africa Archive – todor66.com
كأس الأمم الأفريقية لكرة اليد رجال – kooora.com

 
Men's sports competitions in Africa
Recurring sporting events established in 1974